Urshan may refer to:

People
 Andrew David Urshan (1884-1967), a Persian-born Assyrian evangelist and author. 
 Shamiram Urshan (1938–2011), also known as Shamiram Ourshan was an Assyrian singer.

Other
 Urshan College, Christian College in Florissant, Missouri. 
 Urshan Graduate School of Theology, a college.
 Urshan Gateway Library, academic library that supports Urshan Graduate School of Theology and Urshan College.